The 2019 BOLL Warsaw FIM Speedway Grand Prix of Poland was the first race of the 2019 Speedway Grand Prix season. It took place on May 18 at the Stadion Narodowy in Warsaw, Poland.

Riders 
First reserve Robert Lambert replaced the injured Maciej Janowski, while second reserve Max Fricke replaced Greg Hancock. The Speedway Grand Prix Commission nominated Bartosz Smektała as the wild card, and Dominik Kubera and Rafał Karczmarz both as Track Reserves.

Results 
The Grand Prix was won by Leon Madsen, who beat Fredrik Lindgren, Patryk Dudek and Niels-Kristian Iversen in the final. It was the Madsen's first ever Grand Prix win, on what was his first ever start as a regular member of the Grand Prix series.

Dudek had initially top scored with 13 points during the qualifying heats, and despite finishing third in the final, he topped the overall standings with 16 points, one ahead of Lindgren.

Heat details

Intermediate classification

References 

Poland
Speedway Grand Prix
Sports competitions in Warsaw
Grand
2019